St. Brides Netherwent is a parish and largely deserted village in Monmouthshire, south-east Wales. It is centred 2 miles north of Magor, and 3 miles west of Caerwent. The A48 Newport to Chepstow road passes close by to the north.

History
The church of Saint Bridget or Brigid is set in quiet countryside, adjoining the site of a deserted medieval village. It was traditionally founded by Brochwael, the son of Meurig of Gwent, in the 10th century. The church tower dates from the 13th or 14th century, but the body of the church was rebuilt in the 19th century after it became dilapidated.

The parish was part of the medieval lordship of Striguil. It is so named to distinguish it from the village of St. Brides Wentloog, to the west of Newport. "Netherwent" is the English name given from the Norman period onwards to the Welsh cantref of Gwent-is-coed (Gwent beneath the wood, i.e. Wentwood), with "-went" deriving from the Roman town of Venta which became Caerwent.

Aside from today's farmhouses outlying the clustered centre, St. Brides Netherwent was abandoned in the 18th century.

Local schools 
Both Magor Church in Wales Primary School and Undy Primary School are within catchment of the area. Caldicot School is the local secondary school within the catchment area.

Notes

External links
Caerwent Community website – St. Brides Netherwent church
Monumental Inscriptions for St Brides Netherwent
A Bronze Age flint arrowhead from near St. Brides Netherwent
Info on Saint Bridget / Brighid

Villages in Monmouthshire
Former villages in Wales